Brian Brett (born 28 April 1950) is a Canadian poet, journalist, editor and novelist.  He has been writing and publishing since the late 1960s, and he has worked as an editor for several publishing firms, including the Governor-General's Award-winning Blackfish Press. He has also written a three-part memoir of his life in British Columbia.

Early life
Brett was born in British Columbia. He grew up with a rare endocrine disorder, Kallmann syndrome, which prevented his body from entering puberty; he later wrote a memoir about the effect this has had on his life.
Brett attended Simon Fraser University between 1969 and 1974, studying literature.

Career

Brett began writing in the 1960s. In the early 1970s, he worked as a freelance journalist and critic for The Globe and Mail, the Toronto Star, the Vancouver Sun, The New Reader, Books in Canada, and the Victoria Times-Colonist. He was a poetry critic and columnist for Vancouver's The Province. He also wrote articles for many other newspapers in Canada, and his essays appeared in many magazines. For ten years he wrote a monthly newspaper column called CultureWatch for the Yukon News.

Brett inaugurated the B.C. Poetry-in-the-Schools program, which for several years introduced students to world poetry. He has presented many writing workshops across Canada.

He has been a member of P.E.N. International and the Federation of BC Writers, and the Writers' Union of Canada. He embarked on a national reading tour organized by the League of Canadian Poets, of which he was also a member.

Brett has given reading of his work on CBC Radio as well at universities, Harbourfront, Vancouver International Writers Festival, Saltwater Festival, Sechelt Writers' Festival, Wordfest: Banff Calgary International Writers Festival, the Winnipeg International Writers Festival, National Book Festival, and the Canada Council.

In May 2005, Brett became chair of the Writers' Union of Canada.

In 2004 Brett published a book, Uproar's Your Only Music, about his struggles with Kallmann syndrome.

In November 2009, Brett won Canada's Writers' Trust Non-Fiction Prize for Trauma Farm: A Rebel History of Rural Life. The book describes a typical day in the life of his farm, with insight into the natural history of farming.

In 2016, the Writers' Trust of Canada awarded Brett the Matt Cohen Lifetime Award to honour his body of work.

Personal
Brett lives on his farm on Salt Spring Island, British Columbia. He takes testosterone to mitigate the effects of Kallmann syndrome, which include pain and osteoperosis.

Bibliography
Fossil Ground at Phantom Creek - 1976
Smoke Without Exit - 1984
Evolution in Every Direction - 1987
The Fungus Garden - 1988
Tanganyika - 1991
Poems: New and Selected - 1993
Allegories of Love and Disaster - 1993
The Colour of Bones in a Stream - 1998
Coyote - 2003 
Uproar's Your Only Music - 2004 
Trauma Farm: A Rebel History of Rural Life - 2009 
The Wind River Variations - 2012 
Tuco: The Parrot, the Others, and a Scattershot World - 2015

Discography
Night Directions for the Lost- The Talking Songs of Brian Brett Tongue & Groove Records - 2003
Talking Songs by Scattered Bodies - 2014

Anthologies
Poems from Planet Earth, (Poetry), Leaf Press, Winter 2013
In The Flesh, Twenty Writers Explore the Body, (Essays) Brindle & Glass, ed. by Lynne Van Luven & Kathy Page, 2011
Measure of the Year, (introduction), by Roderick Haig-Brown, Touchwood Editions, 2011
The Heart Does Break: Canadian Writers on Grief and Mourning, (Essays) Random House. Ed. By George Bowering and Jean Baird. Random House. 2009
Open Wide Wilderness: Canadian Nature Poems, Wilfrid Laurier Press, ed. by Nancy Holmes. 2009
A Verse Map of Vancouver ed. By George McWhirter, Anvil Press, 2009.
Wild Rivers of the Yukon's Peel Watershed: A Traveller's Guide (Poetry & Prose), Juri Peepre and Sarah Locke, 2008.
Writing The West Coast, Ronsdale Press, 2008.
Three Rivers: The Yukon's Great Boreal Wilderness Harbour Publishing, 2005.
Rendezvous With The Wild Houghton Mifflin, 2004.
The Eye In The Thicket (Natural History Essays) Thistledown Books 2002.
Mocambo Nights, ed. by Patrick Lane, Ekstasis Editions, 2001.
Lost Classics ed. by Ondaatje, Spalding, Redhill (Essays) Anchor Classics, 2001.
In The Clear (Fiction & Poetry) Thistledown Books, 1998.
What is Already Known (Fiction & Poetry) Thistledown Books, 1995.
How I Learned To Speak Dog (Poetry & Prose) Douglas & McIntyre.
Witness To Wilderness (Poetry & Prose), Arsenal Pulp Press, 1994.
Because You Loved Being A Stranger, (Poems) ed. by Susan Musgrave, Harbour Publishing, 1994.
Myths & Voices (Short Stories), White Pine Press, U.S.A.,1993.
The Last Map Is The Heart (Short Stories), Thistledown Books, 1989.
15 Years In Exile, Exile, 1992.
Vancouver Poetry (Poetry), Polestar Press, 1986.
For Rexroth (Poetry), The Ark, 1980.
Western Windows (Poetry & Prose), Commcept Publishing Ltd., 1977.
A Government Job At Last (Poetry), MacLeod Books, 1977.

References

External links
 
 Brian Brett fonds at University of Victoria, Special Collections
 Archives of Blackfish Press (Blackfish Press, R11707) are held at Library and Archives Canada. Brian Brett is one of the founders of the magazine with Allan Safarik

1950 births
Living people
Canadian male novelists
Canadian memoirists
Simon Fraser University alumni
Writers from Vancouver
20th-century Canadian novelists
21st-century Canadian novelists
20th-century Canadian poets
20th-century Canadian male writers
Canadian male poets
21st-century Canadian poets
Articles containing video clips
21st-century Canadian male writers
Canadian male non-fiction writers